Gabriel Lettieri is an Argentine football midfielder He was born on March 1, 1975, in Buenos Aires in  Argentina.

Lettieri started his career in 1995 with Club Atlético Huracán in the Primera Division Argentina. In 1998, he was transferred to Primera B side All Boys.

In 2000, he moved to Europe to play for French club FC Gueugnon.

External links
 Gabriel Lettieri at BDFA.com.ar 
 Gabriel Lettieri is also known for his work on the 2006-07 Season of Super League Greece (IMDb) 

Argentine footballers
Association football midfielders
Club Atlético Huracán footballers
All Boys footballers
FC Gueugnon players
Ionikos F.C. players
Kallithea F.C. players
Footballers from Buenos Aires
1975 births
Living people
Expatriate footballers in Greece